Allqamari (Quechua for mountain caracara, also spelled Alcamari) is a  mountain in the Bolivian Andes. It is located in the Chuquisaca Department, Nor Cinti Province, San Lucas Municipality. It lies near the Waylla Mayu.

References 

Mountains of Chuquisaca Department